The Microdata Information System (MISSY) is a database-driven online system that provides structured metadata on selected research data of official statistics as part of the service infrastructure of the German Microdata Lab (GML) at GESIS – Leibniz Institute for the Social Sciences. MISSY is aimed at empirically working scientists who use official microdata for their research. In MISSY, detailed metadata on individual data sets of German and European official statistics are made available to facilitate the use of the data by providing user-friendly and quickly accessible data documentation.

Documented data
Metadata for the following microdata are provided and regularly updated in MISSY:
 German Microcensus (MZ)
 European Union Statistics on Income and Living Conditions (EU-SILC)
 European Union Labour Force Survey (EU-LFS)
All documentation in MISSY refers to microdata available for scientific purposes (Scientific Use Files).

Coverage
The metadata offered in MISSY includes all aspects of information relevant for an analysis of the data collected in the respective surveys. The MISSY metadata schema is based on the expertise of the GML in the field of official microdata and the recommendations of the international documentation standard of the Data Documentation Initiative (DDI). MISSY also follows the FAIR criteria (findable, accessible, interoperable, and reusable).
In MISSY, the research-relevant metadata on official microdata are digitally prepared, enabling their quick retrieval via a database and comparisons between survey years and countries. In addition to in-depth study descriptions, MISSY contains detailed variable information, so that researchers can find out in advance whether the variables contained in the data are suitable for their research question. MISSY also provides univariate frequency distributions of the variables, allowing for a comparison of the variables of interest, which is very useful for preparing analyses over time or cross-national comparisons.
Syntax routines developed by the GML for the preparation and analysis of official microdata are also made available in MISSY. These include, for example, routines to import raw data into various statistical software packages (SAS, SPSS, Stata, R) as well as routines for the operationalization of social science classifications (e.g. European Socio-economic Groups ESeG or International Socio-Economic Index of Occupational Status ISEI).

External links
 Microdata Information System MISSY
 Homepage of GESIS
 German Microdata Lab
 Data access European microdata
 Data access German Microcensus

References

Databases